Meg Bennett is an American television soap opera writer and occasional actress. She is married to ex-General Hospital head writer Robert Guza Jr.

Early life
Born Helen Bennett on October 4, 1948, Meg is the eldest daughter of a printing company executive and a psychologist, and grew up in Pasadena, California. She majored in drama at Northwestern University, acted in summer stock during college breaks, and worked as a model, including an appearance in Life magazine. She changed her name to Meg because there was already a Helen Bennett registered with the Screen Actors' Guild.

Career
In 1971 she was hired as the "Cadillac Eldorado convertible girl" for a New York auto show, which prompted her to move to Manhattan. There she appeared on the game show Three on a Match, where she won $10,000 in prizes and was an undefeated champion. She was an original cast member of the Broadway production Grease, which led to her being cast on the daytime soap opera Search for Tomorrow in 1974. She played the role of the good girl Liza for three years, then left New York for California. She also appeared occasionally as a panelist on Match Game.

Bennett suffered a bout of hepatitis, and once recovered, she was cast as Julia Newman on The Young and the Restless in 1980. She played the role on-and-off for six years, during which time she impressed Bill Bell, the creator of the show, with her on-set skills as a script doctor. He asked her to write for the show in 1981, and thereafter she began doing double duty as writer and actress on the show. Her writing duties usurped her acting career, and she shared an Emmy award with the rest of the writing staff for General Hospital in 1995. She still acts occasionally, playing such roles as the villainous Allegra on General Hospital.  She was fired in 2011 by Garin Wolf after his promotion to head writer.

Positions held
The Bold and the Beautiful
Script Writer: 1987–1989
Executive Storyline Consultant: August 6, 2002 – October 2004 (hired by Bradley Bell)

General Hospital
Breakdown Writer: 1987–1989; 1994–1997 (hired by Claire Labine); 1999 – December 2000; April 3, 2009–July 2011
Actress: Allegra Montenegro (August 2005)

General Hospital: Night Shift
Script Writer: August 9 – October 4, 2007

Generations (hired by Sally Sussman Morina)
Writer: 1989–1990

Santa Barbara
Breakdown Writer: 1991–1993
Actress: Megan Richardson 1989

Sunset Beach
Associate Head Writer: 1997
Co-Head Writer: October 1997 – August 1998

The Young and the Restless
Script Writer: 1981–1987
Actress: Julia Newman 1980–1984, 1986–1987, 2002, 2018, 2020

Personal life
She met her husband Robert Guza Jr. when they were both hired to write for a soap opera. They have collaborated ever since, writing for several soap operas.

In 2003, they bought a Beverly Hills home formerly owned by Boris Karloff, then Gregory Peck, for $2.8 million.

Awards and nominations
Daytime Emmy Award
Nomination, 2003, Best Writing, Bold and The Beautiful
Win, 1995, Best Writing, General Hospital
Nominations, 1995, 1997 and 2000, Best Writing, General Hospital
Nomination, 1986, Best Writing, The Young And The Restless

Writers Guild of America Award
Nomination, 1997 season, Sunset Beach
Wins, 1994, 1995 and 1997 seasons, General Hospital
Nominations, 1993–1997 seasons, General Hospital
Wins, 1991 and 1992 seasons, Santa Barbara

References

External links
 

American soap opera writers
American soap opera actresses
Northwestern University School of Communication alumni
Daytime Emmy Award winners
American women television writers
Writers Guild of America Award winners
Year of birth missing (living people)
Living people
Place of birth missing (living people)
Women soap opera writers